Edward R. Talley (September 8 (or 6), 1890 –  December 14, 1950) was a United States Army Soldier who received the Medal of Honor for his actions near Ponchaux, France during World War I.

Biography
Depending on the reference, Edward R. Talley was born on either September 6 or 8, 1890 in Russellville, Tennessee. He joined the United States Army from Russellville and after completing recruit training was sent to France where he distinguished himself in action near Ponchaux, France. He was a Sergeant, in Company L, 117th Infantry, 30th Division when he was awarded the Medal of Honor for his actions on October 7, 1918.

Talley died December 14, 1950, and is buried at Bent Creek Cemetery in Whitesburg, Tennessee.

Medal of Honor citation
Rank and organization: Sergeant, U.S. Army, Company L, 117th Infantry, 30th Division. Place and date: Near Ponchaux, France, October 7, 1918. Entered service at: Russellville, Tenn. Born: September 8, 1890, Russellville, Tenn. G.O. No.: 50, W.D., 1919.

Citation:
Undeterred by seeing several comrades killed in attempting to put a hostile machine gun nest out of action, Sgt. Talley attacked the position single-handed. Armed only with a rifle, he rushed the nest in the face of intense enemy fire, killed or wounded at least 6 of the crew, and silenced the gun. When the enemy attempted to bring forward another gun and ammunition he drove them back by effective fire from his rifle.

See also

List of Medal of Honor recipients
List of Medal of Honor recipients for World War I

References

Notes
 There is inconsistency in the date of Birth for Edward Talley between the Find a Grave website and the Medal of Honor citation. The citation lists his birth date as September 8, 1890 and the Find a Grave website lists September 6, 1890.

United States Army Medal of Honor recipients
United States Army non-commissioned officers
United States Army personnel of World War I
People from Hamblen County, Tennessee
1890 births
1950 deaths
World War I recipients of the Medal of Honor
Military personnel from Tennessee
Burials in Tennessee